The Vapriikki Museum Centre (Finnish: Museokeskus Vapriikki) is a cluster of museums operating in the old factory premises of Tampella, in Tampere, Finland. The name Vapriikki derives from the Swedish word fabrik, meaning factory.

Overview
The facility was first opened to the public in 1996, and the centre was completed in 2000.

In 2019, the centre was visited by over 170,000 visitors.

In 2017, Vapriikki Museum Centre was chosen as the "Museum of the Century" in a public vote to mark the 100th anniversary of Finnish independence.

Museums
Museums based in the centre include:
Natural History Museum of Tampere
Rupriikki Media Museum
Finnish Museum of Games
Finnish Ice Hockey Museum and the Finnish Hockey Hall of Fame
Postal Museum (Postimuseo)
Doll and Dress Museum (Nukke- ja pukumuseo)
Pirkanmaa Regional Museum (Pirkanmaan maakuntamuseo)

References

External links

Museums in Finland
Museums in Pirkanmaa
Museums in Tampere
Tourist attractions in Tampere
Tampere